The Untouched Woman (German: Die unberührte Frau) is a 1925 German silent film directed by Constantin J. David and starring Mary Nolan, Tamara Geva, and Alf Blütecher. The film's sets were designed by the art director Karl Görge.

Cast
 Mary Nolan as Marcelle Vautier 
 Tamara Geva as Jane, ihre Mutter
 Alf Blütecher as Roger Clermont 
 Harry Halm as Lucien, sein Bruder 
 Jeanne de Balzac as Colette Duflos 
 Hans Junkermann as Casimir Lebrun 
 Hans Behrendt as André, Luciens Freund 
 Ulrich Bettac as Jasmin Potfin

References

Bibliography
Hans-Michael Bock and Tim Bergfelder. The Concise Cinegraph: An Encyclopedia of German Cinema. Berghahn Books, 2009.

External links

1925 films
Films of the Weimar Republic
Films directed by Constantin J. David
German silent feature films
Bavaria Film films
German black-and-white films